A Bit of Love is a 1932 German comedy film directed by Max Neufeld and starring Lee Parry, Magda Schneider, and Hermann Thimig.

It was made at the Johannisthal Studios in Berlin. The film's art direction was by Ernö Metzner. A separate French-language film Monsieur, Madame and Bibi and an Italian Two Happy Hearts were also released.

Cast

Other film versions
 Monsieur, Madame and Bibi (March 1932, France, directed by Max Neufeld and Jean Boyer)
 Two Happy Hearts (September 1932, Italy, directed by Baldassarre Negroni)
 Yes, Mr Brown (January 1933, UK, directed by Herbert Wilcox)

References

Bibliography

External links 
 

1932 films
1932 comedy films
German comedy films
Films of the Weimar Republic
1930s German-language films
Films directed by Max Neufeld
German multilingual films
German black-and-white films
Films shot at Johannisthal Studios
Bavaria Film films
Films scored by Paul Abraham
1932 multilingual films
1930s German films